The Journal of Bisexuality is a peer-reviewed academic journal published quarterly by the Taylor & Francis Group under the Routledge imprint. It is the official journal of the American Institute of Bisexuality. It covers a wide range of topics on bisexuality including new bisexuality research, bisexual issues in therapy, differences from the straight, lesbian and gay communities, growth of the bisexual movement, bisexuality and the media, bisexual history, and different bisexual lifestyles.

In addition, the journal also publishes book and movie reviews covering bisexual lead characters from every era. Special thematic issues cover topics singularly; such as women and bisexuality — a global perspective, bisexual women in the 21st century, bisexual men in culture and society, and bisexuality in the lives of men.

The journal was established in 2000. Its first editor-in-chief was Fritz Klein, followed by Jonathan Alexander, Brian Zamboni, and James D. Weinrich. In 2014, M. Paz Galupo became its first female editor-in-chief.

Abstracting and indexing 
The journal is abstracted and indexed in Academic Search Premier, PsycINFO, ProQuest, GLBT Life, Contemporary Women's Issues, LGBT Life, and Sociological Abstracts.

See also 
 Journal of Homosexuality
 List of sexology journals

References

External links 
 

Bisexual culture in the United States
Bisexuality-related literature
Works about bisexuality
LGBT-related mass media in the United States
Publications established in 2000
Quarterly journals
Sexology journals
Sexual orientation and science
English-language journals
Taylor & Francis academic journals
LGBT-related journals